Rami Ollaik (born 1972) is a Lebanese writer, political activist, attorney, and professor of beekeeping in the American University of Beirut (AUB). He is also the founder of the Lebanon Ahead movement, and initiator of the 10 October Revolution. He is best known for his autobiography, The Bees Road (طريق النحل).

Life
Ollaik was born in Khiam in southern Lebanon to a family with a heritage in beekeeping. At the age of 13, Ollaik was recruited into Hezbollah and later on became the party's student representative at AUB. Between 1992 and 1996, Ollaik played a crucial role in Hezbollah's growing and controversial influence in AUB, and led the 10 October student protest of 1994. Ollaik resigned from the party's ranks in 1996.

In 2008, Ollaik published his autobiography, "The Bees Road", which recounts his experience with Hezbollah. The book was rewritten in English and a French adaptive translation "La Route des Abeilles" was released by Editions Anne Carriere in Paris. A sequel to The Bees Road, "Under the Green Waters", was published in Arabic on November 21, 2012 and a second sequel is currently underway – the final version of the trilogy. Ollaik published Your Guide to Beekeeping - Arabic in 2010, co-written with his father Salman Ollaik.

In 2009, Ollaik founded Lebanon Ahead, a movement aimed at improving the country and changing it into a peaceful and democratic nation by creating a platform of communication and understanding among citizens. Through it, he founded a coalition of independent democratic civic forces “Takaddom” and ran with two other candidates on Lebanon Ahead's ticket in the general parliamentary elections.

Ollaik also launched a national protest movement for political reform in 2013, “10 October Revolution”, which focused on the need to abolish the Lebanese sectarian political system through amending the prevailing sectarian structure of the Lebanese state since Independence. The revolution calls for the establishment of a sovereign nation for all Lebanese, where all citizens are equal under the law and where corruption is curbed, and for restoring the voting power of the people through a just, modern, non-sectarian electoral law.

In 2013, Sofia Amara directed, alongside Bruno Joucla, the documentary The renegade on the work of Ollaik.

Education
Ollaik pursued a BS in agriculture and diploma in agricultural engineering and an MS in agricultural economics at AUB, and a PhD in food and resource economics at the University of Florida. He also obtained a License degree in Law from the Lebanese University and became an attorney at law at the Beirut Bar Association.

Books 
The Bees Road (English and Arabic) 

In an inspirational journey that takes the reader from war-torn South Lebanon to a detention cell at JFK airport, The Bees Road is the personal narrative of Rami Ollaik. A Lebanese Shiite raised in an environment full of violence and cruelty, Rami joins and rises to the top echelons of Hezbollah. After 13 years of party involvement, he reevaluates his life and his conception of love in an attempt to rid himself of his haunting fundamentalist past and to finally pursue his ultimate goal of personal freedom. A rough path that leaves him a traitor to Hezbollah, a suspected terrorist to the United States, a professor of beekeeping in Beirut, and author of The Bees Road.

The Bees Road follows the true life of Rami Ollaik starting with his childhood in Southern Lebanon at the brink of the Lebanese Civil War. This ravaged landscape proves inescapable, and, like many Southern Lebanese Shiites, Rami is drawn to Hezbollah's resistance movement and indoctrinated into a path of fundamentalist Islam.

Distinguishing himself in the Party of God, Rami builds friendships and connections with some of Hezbollah's most prominent figures. However, as he moves to Lebanon's capital to attend the American University of Beirut and head Hezbollah's AUB recruitment operations, pivotal events on campus and key interactions with the student body cause him to question his values, his views on women, and even the Party itself.

After clashing with Hezbollah's leadership, Rami leaves the Party of God to pursue a life of open-mindedness and freedom. This personal reform proves difficult, involving humiliating romantic interactions and a troubling suicide attempt, but eventually the path of the new Rami takes him all the way to the United States to pursue his education. In the land of “The Great Satan,” it doesn’t take long for Rami to fall in love with everything that America stands for. Unfortunately, the fateful events of September 11 and the resulting national paranoia and Islamophobia push Rami into confrontations with the FBI, blackmail, and interrogation. After an unexpected and unwarranted deportation from the US, Rami's assistant-ship is canceled and he's forced to continue his PhD studies through distance correspondence.

The story ends with Rami back in his home country teaching beekeeping at AUB, filled with the urge to build a stronger Lebanon and unite the nation as whole.

A French version of the book, La route des abeilles, was released in France by Éditions Anne Carriere. - 

Under The Green Waters (Arabic)

A war-shocked child brought under the wing of Hezbollah. That child's growth into a man, and his subsequent Intifadas. A traitor to Hezbollah, a suspected terrorist to the United States, a professor of beekeeping and author of The Bees Road. Where is Rami Ollaik? Where has his unlikely path taken him? And, perhaps most importantly, who has been watching him?

Under The Green Waters is the continuation of the story laid down in The Bees Road: a story of the publication's fallout, its blow on the author and impact on Lebanese politics, and a story of meticulous sabotage. In the theo-political war of ideology, words carry weight and the author's words published in The Bees Road prove to be heavy. How did the Party of God react to his blasphemies? Who was listening to his message, and where did their allegiances finally lie?

In a novel of intimidation, backstabbing and dangerous politics, Under The Green Waters takes us even deeper into the murky circles of the corrupt Lebanese State. Tracing the life of Rami Ollaik, from the publication of The Bees Road to Lebanon Ahead's brief and foiled attempts to create a unifying bridge in the Lebanese political scene, the author creatively illustrates the aftermath of his first novel and exposes the impact, both on society and personal life, that one book can have.

Under The Green Waters is a work of nonfiction, a literary autobiographical account of the author's story from its writing to its release in 2008 and the aftermath. The story, following the popularity of his first book in Lebanon, traces his formation of the idealistic post-partisan unity movement Lebanon Ahead. The story follows the release of his unprecedented publication where he shows the behind-the-scenes nature of democracy in the Middle East, the intricately calibrated intimidation campaigns, and the problematic practices of US-Mid East relations. While these themes remain poignant, it is also a story of love, betrayal, fear, hope, and devastating heartbreak.

Under the Green Waters was published in Arabic on November 21, 2012. - 

Lost in the Barn (Arabic)

After "The Bees Road" and "Under The Green Waters", the third sequel to the first book "Lost In The Barn" by Rami Ollaik (Arabic) carries us on a journey through real life events. A leap from Hezbollah to true patriotism, passing through identity crisis, meticulous sabotage, a hope for a long-awaited justice, and ending with an encounter with the Special Tribunal for Lebanon. 
"Lost In The Barn" follows the author's autobiographic account in his BEES ROAD TRILOGY, his reaching out for a nation amidst the encompassing corruption and deterioration of the Lebanese State, extending to member states of the whole region. A book that offers an in-depth analysis of the regional and international schemes to maintain power over the little nation, and all the repercussions that have caused the extreme divisions, destruction and bloodshed that we are witnessing today.
"Lost In The Barn" makes you deep-dive into the human dichotomy of hope and disappointments, in a journey of pilgrimage that links the past experiences to the present sufferings and embarks on a father's witnessing of that and his passing away. A rebirth. 
"Lost In The Barn" invigorates those with a pressing quest for prosperity, carries them through the darkness to the light, where no secrets prevail.

The Bees Road Trilogy (Arabic)

The Bees Road Trilogy (Arabic) is the personal narrative of Rami Ollaik in three books: The Bees Road, Under The Green Waters and Lost In The Barn.

In an inspirational journey that takes the reader from war-torn South Lebanon to a detention cell at JFK airport, The Bees Road is the personal narrative of Rami Ollaik. A Lebanese Shiite raised in an environment full of violence and cruelty, Rami joins and rises to the top echelons of Hezbollah. In 1994, and after 13 years of party involvement, he reevaluates his life and his conception of love in an attempt to rid himself of his haunting fundamentalist past and to finally pursue his ultimate goal of personal freedom. A rough path that leaves him a traitor to Hezbollah, a suspected terrorist to the United States.

Under The Green Waters is the continuation of the story laid down in The Bees Road: a story of the publication's fallout, its blow on the author and impact on Lebanese politics, and a story of meticulous sabotage. A literary autobiographical account of the author's story during the year 2008 that takes us deep into the murky circles of the corrupt Lebanese State; showing the behind-the-scenes nature of democracy in the Middle East, and the intricately calibrated intimidation campaigns. It is also a story of love, betrayal, fear, hope and devastating heartbreaks.

The third and last book of the trilogy, Lost In The Barn, is a journey through real life events that affected the author's life between the years 2008 and 2010. A leap from Hezbollah to true patriotism, passing through identity crisis, meticulous sabotage, a hope for a long-awaited justice, and ending with an encounter with the Special Tribunal for Lebanon, with a father passing away after having witnessed all the past sufferings.

The Bees Road
In an inspirational journey that takes the reader from war-torn South Lebanon to a detention cell at JFK airport, The Bees Road is the personal narrative of Rami Ollaik. A Lebanese Shiite raised in an environment full of violence and cruelty, Rami joins and rises to the top echelons of Hezbollah. After 13 years of party involvement, he reevaluates his life and his conception of love in an attempt to rid himself of his haunting fundamentalist past and to finally pursue his ultimate goal of personal freedom. A rough path that leaves him a traitor to Hezbollah, a suspected terrorist to the United States, a professor of beekeeping in Beirut, and author of The Bees Road.

The Bees Road follows the true life of Rami Ollaik starting with his childhood in Southern Lebanon at the brink of the Lebanese Civil War. This ravaged landscape proves inescapable, and, like many Southern Lebanese Shiites, Rami is drawn to Hezbollah's resistance movement and indoctrinated into a path of fundamentalist Islam.

Distinguishing himself in the Party of God, Rami builds friendships and connections with some of Hezbollah's most prominent figures. However, as he moves to Lebanon's capital to attend the American University of Beirut and head Hezbollah's AUB recruitment operations, pivotal events on campus and key interactions with the student body cause him to question his values, his views on women, and even the Party itself.

After clashing with Hezbollah's leadership, Rami leaves the Party of God to pursue a life of open-mindedness and freedom. This personal reform proves difficult, involving humiliating romantic interactions and a troubling suicide attempt, but eventually the path of the new Rami takes him all the way to the United States to pursue his education. In the land of “The Great Satan,” it doesn’t take long for Rami to fall in love with everything that America stands for. Unfortunately, the fateful events of September 11 and the resulting national paranoia and Islamophobia push Rami into confrontations with the FBI, blackmail, and interrogation. After an unexpected and unwarranted deportation from the US, Rami's assistant-ship is canceled and he's forced to continue his PhD studies through distance correspondence.

The story ends with Rami back in his home country teaching beekeeping at AUB, filled with the urge to build a stronger Lebanon and unite the nation as whole.

A French version of the book, La route des abeilles, was released in France by Éditions Anne Carriere.

La Route des Abeilles
La Route des Abeilles retrace le parcours d’un jeune chiite du sud du Liban amené à devenir un enfant soldat dans les rangs du Hezbollah. Tournant le dos à une famille modérée et aimante, il accédera, pendant ses treize années au sein de la formation, aux échelons supérieurs du parti.

Etudiant en droit puis en économie à l’Université américaine de Beyrouth, il devient un leader étudiant pour la cause avant de se laisser peu à peu fasciner par la diversité et la sécularité qu’il découvre dans la capitale. Ouvrant les yeux sur la duplicité, la corruption et le fanastisme du Hezbollah, il le quitte : une première dans l’histoire de ce mouvement, peu habitué aux voix discordantes.

Traître aux yeux de ses anciens frères d’armes, il va entamer un long et difficile chemin vers l’émancipation, qui le conduira du Liban ravagé par les conflits jusqu’aux Etats-Unis, où il suivra un doctorat, pour finir soupçonné de terrorisme et expulsé après le 11 septembre 2001.

Your Guide to Beekeeping (Arabic)

A scientific guide to modern beekeeping that stems from both academic and long-term practical experience in developmental apiculture. The book follows a forthright approach in outlining the fundamentals of the life of the honeybee and illustrates both the individual and social aspects of one of nature's most fascinating creatures, starting with species and race evolution, genetics, anatomy and physiology, and ending with the bee's social behavior as a member of a colony. It also depicts the delicate ecological interaction of the honeybee with its surrounding flora and fauna, especially in light of the worldwide alarming Colony collapse disorder (CCD) phenomenon. It helps both beekeepers and amateurs utilize the presented knowledge in the collection of as much potential products and services from the colony as possible.

.

Lebanon Ahead
The Way Out
Lebanon Ahead is a collaborated human effort aiming at making Lebanon a better place where citizens can live with dignity and freedom. Lebanon Ahead's objective is reviving the nation, the "we feeling", and the sense of responsibility by building the country economically, socially and politically.

The Focus
Lebanon Ahead's focus is the Lebanese educated and vibrant youth who are capable of restructuring the civic society.

Beekeeping

Since his early childhood, Rami Ollaik was introduced to beekeeping through his father. He joined the American University in Beirut (AUB) to study agriculture, the field closest to beekeeping at the time. His first scientific approach to the bee world was his MS thesis dealing with economic and marketing modeling of apiculture in Lebanon. Afterwards in 1998, he started conducting applied research on local honeybees, as well as imported strains, in order to assess their productivity and adaptivity to local production conditions and thus arrive at a superior stock. While pursuing his doctorate studies at the University of Florida, Ollaik expanded his expertise and exposure to the international practices related to bees and beekeeping. Rami's passion for bees led him to carry on his father's work of developing the beekeeping industry all over Lebanon through teaching, research and extension services at AUB. Ollaik was the first to introduce beekeeping into the curriculum of AUB's Faculty of Agriculture & Food Sciences, designed Lebanon's first beekeepers calendar, improved local beekeeping cultural practices along modern scientific lines, focused on integrated pest management systems and added scientific guidelines to honey production and marketing. He organized at AUB the first and second national scientific conferences for the improvement and modernization of beekeeping practices.

He also worked on the development of beekeeping practices in the Arab region and participated in many international conferences. His publications about beekeeping, including the book "Your guide to beekeeping" - Arabic, were considered the first scientific releases about apiculture in Lebanon.

References

Lebanese activists
1972 births
Living people